Dolores Formation may refer to
 Dolores Formation, Chinle Group, Triassic geologic formation of the United States
 Dolores Formation, Uruguay, Pleistocene geologic formation of Uruguay